Henrique Campos (9 February 1909 – 18 December 1983) was a Portuguese film director.

Selected filmography
Um Homem do Ribatejo (1946)
 The Holy Queen (1947)
Ribatejo (1949)
Cantiga da Rua (1950)
Duas Causas (1953)
Rosa de Alfama (1953)
Quando o Mar Galgou a Terra (1954)
Perdeu-se um Marido (1957)
O Homem do Dia (1958)
A Luz Vem do Alto (1959)
Pão, Amor e... Totobola (1964)
A Canção da Saudade (1964)
Estrada da Vida (1968)
O Ladrão de Quem se Fala (1969)
O Destino Marca a Hora (1970)
A Maluquinha de Arroios (1970)
Os Touros de Mary Foster (1972)

External links

Biography at the Centro de Língua Portuguesa / Instituto Camões at the University of Hamburg 

1909 births
1983 deaths
Portuguese film directors
People from Santarém, Portugal